Stanley and Stanley Common is a civil parish in south-east Derbyshire in the East Midlands of England.  It comprises the villages of Stanley and Stanley Common. The population of the civil parish as of the 2011 census was 2,100.

In former years, the civil parish was simply known as Stanley, but the name was changed in the 1990s.

Although in the borough of Erewash, the parish is in the UK Parliamentary Constituency of Mid Derbyshire.

See also
Listed buildings in Stanley and Stanley Common

References

External links 

  Stanley Village Trail on Ilkcam.com contains more detailed information and photographs
 Stanley & Stanley Common Parish Council

Civil parishes in Derbyshire
Borough of Erewash